Gisele or Gisèle is a given name. The name is from Old German gesel meaning to "pledge" and variant of Giselle, Gisela etc.

Notable people with the name include:

Gisele
Gisele Ben-Dor (born 1955), American Israeli orchestra conductor of Uruguayan origin
Gisele Bennett, American Professor of Electrical Engineering
Gisele Bomentre, Brazilian belly dancer and Brazilian Arabic singer
Gisele Bündchen (born 1980), Brazilian supermodel
Gisele Barreto Fetterman, Brazilian-American activist
Gisele Jackson, American house music diva
Gisele MacKenzie (1927–2003), Canadian singer
Gisele Marvin (born 1987), American ice hockey player
Gisele Miró (born 1968), Brazilian tennis player
Gisele de Oliveira (born 1980), Brazilian triple jumper

Gisèle
Gisèle Barreau (born 1948), French composer
Gisèle Biémouret (born 1952), French politician and member of the National Assembly of France 
Gisèle Bienne (born 1946), French writer and novelist
Gisèle Caille, French racing cyclist 
Gisèle Casadesus (born 1914), French actress 
Gisèle d'Estoc (1845-1894), French writer, sculptor, feminist
Gisèle Freund (1908-2000), German-born French photographer
Gisèle Gautier (born 1938), French politician and a member of the Senate of France
Gisèle Halimi (1927-2020), French-Tunisian lawyer, feminist activist and essayist
Gisèle Lagacé (born 1970), Canadian webcomic creator
Gisèle Lalonde (born 1933), mayor of the city of Vanier from 1985 to 1991
Gisèle Lamoureux, Canadian photographer, botanist and ecologist from Quebec 
Gisèle Lestrange (1927–1991), French graphic artist
Gisèle Mendy (born 1979), Senegalese judoka
Gisèle Meygret (1963–1999), French fencer
Gisèle Ory (born 1956), Swiss politician from the Canton of Neuchâtel
Gisèle Pascal (1921–2007), French actress and a former lover of Rainier III, Prince of Monaco
Gisèle Pineau (born 1956), French novelist, writer and former psychiatric nurse
Gisèle Prassinos (born 1920), French writer of Greek heritage, associated with the surrealist movement
Gisèle Printz (born 1933), French politician and member of the Senate of France
Gisèle Wulfsohn (1957–2011), South African photographer

Giselle

See also
Giselle (disambiguation)
Gisela (name)

German feminine given names